East Ham Corporation Tramways operated a passenger tramway service in East Ham between 1901 and 1933.

History

East Ham started services on 22 June 1901.

Fleet

1–20 Dick, Kerr & Co. 1901
21–35 Dick, Kerr & Co. 1902
36–40 Dick, Kerr & Co. 1905
41–45 Dick, Kerr & Co. 1910
46 second hand car No 9 from Barking Town Urban District Council Light Railways
47–52 Brush Electrical Engineering Company 1921
37–40 Brush Electrical Engineering Company 1921 (replacing 37–40 of 1905)
51–60 Brush Electrical Engineering Company 1927 (51 and 52 replacing those of 1921)
61–70 Brush Electrical Engineering Company 1928

Closure

The services were taken over by London Passenger Transport Board on 1 July 1933.

References

Trams in London
East Ham